Charlie Patrick Jolley (born 13 January 2001) is an English footballer who plays for Tranmere Rovers.

Club career
Jolley made his debut for Wigan Athletic in May 2019. In November 2019 he joined Curzon Ashton on loan. He scored his first goals for Wigan when he scored twice in a 6-1 EFL Trophy win over Liverpool U21s on 22 September 2020.

He joined Tranmere Rovers on an 18 month contract for an undisclosed fee in January 2021.

On 29 October 2021, Jolley joined National League North side Chester on a one-month loan deal. He scored on his home debut for the club in a 4-0 victory over Boston United. On 1 December 2021, the loan spell was extended for a further month. 

However, on 7 December 2021, Jolley was recalled from his loan spell by parent club Tranmere Rovers who had suffered several injuries to key players. Later that same day, Jolley went on to score a 90th-minute winner for Rovers in a league match against Oldham Athletic at Boundary Park.

Career statistics

References

2001 births
Living people
English footballers
Association football forwards
Wigan Athletic F.C. players
Curzon Ashton F.C. players
Tranmere Rovers F.C. players
Chester F.C. players
English Football League players
National League (English football) players